Mutthaide Bhagya (Kannada: ಮುತ್ತೈದೆ ಭಾಗ್ಯ) is a 1956 Indian Kannada film, directed and produced by B. Vittalacharya. The film stars Mynavathi, M. Jayashree, Revathi and Ramadevi in the lead roles. The film has musical score by Rajan–Nagendra.

Cast

Mynavathi as Vidyavati
M. Jayashree as Gowri
Revathi
Ramadevi
Kalyan Kumar
Hunsur Krishnamurthy
Balakrishna as Gundurao
H. R. Shastry
Girimaji
Dasappa
Master Hirannaiah
Comedian Guggu

References

External links 
 

1956 films
1950s Kannada-language films
Films scored by Rajan–Nagendra
Indian black-and-white films